Gonbad-e Sorkh may refer to:
 Gonbad-e Sorkh, Bandar Abbas
 Gonbad-e Sorkh, Minab
 Gonbad-e Sorkh, Maragheh